Susan Carter Holmes (born 1933) is a botanist and taxonomist at the Royal Botanic Gardens, Kew. She discovered and catalogued more than 200 plants of the family Euphorbiaceae, particularly of the succulent East African members of the genera Euphorbia and Monadenium, as well as about 20 Aloe species. All plants and articles are published under her maiden-name Susan Carter.

Susan Carter Holmes is currently president of the International Euphorbia Society (IES).

Plants named in honor to her are
Euphorbia carteriana P.R.O.Bally 1964
Euphorbia holmesiae Lavranos 1992
Euphorbia susanholmesiae Binojk. & Gopalan 1993

Bibliography

Selected works:
 Carter, Susan: New Succulent Spiny Euphorbias from East Africa, 1982. 
 Carter, Susan & Smith, A.L.: Flora of Tropical East Africa, Euphorbiaceae 1988. 
 Carter, Susan & Eggli, Urs: The CITES Checklist of Succulent Euphorbia Taxa (Euphorbiaceae) 1997.

See also
 List of Euphorbia species

References

Susan Carter, "On being a botanist at Kew", Euphorbia Journal, Vol. 2, pp. 56–60.

1933 births
Living people
English botanists